Meridarchis theriosema is a moth in the family Carposinidae. It is found in Papua New Guinea.

References

Natural History Museum Lepidoptera generic names catalog

External links
www.nhm.ac.uk: images of this species

Carposinidae